George Gardiner (15 July 1900 – 11 September 1924) was a British wrestler. He competed in the freestyle lightweight event at the 1924 Summer Olympics.

References

1900 births
1924 deaths
Olympic wrestlers of Great Britain
Wrestlers at the 1924 Summer Olympics
British male sport wrestlers
Sportspeople from Stirling